Al Yazeedi is a surname and a clan within the Yafa'i tribe. Notable people with the surname include:

Mohammed Al Yazeedi (born 1988), Qatari footballer
Hamood Al Yazeedi (born 1990), Qatari footballer

Surnames of Arabic origin